This article lists the major power stations located in Guangxi province.

Non-renewable

Coal based

Nuclear

Renewable

Hydroelectric

Conventional

 New expansion of 2*300MW of Yantan Hydropower Station started in 2011.

References 

Power stations
Guangxi